J558L cells are mouse B myeloma cells derived from a BALB/c strain isolated by M. Bruggeman and M.S. Neuberger in University of Cambridge. It is a stable B cell line used to express antibodies. They are a suspension cell line and are best cultured in Eagle's minimal essential medium with 10% Fetal bovine serum, 0.01 units/ml of penicillin and 0.1 mg/ml streptomycin incubated in 37 °C + 5% CO2 + 90% relative humidity with a cell density of 5x105 cell per 15 ml.

Uses
This cell line is usually used to express antibodies since they can result in antibody titers up to 1 mg under optimum conditions.

References

External links
Cellosaurus entry for J558L

Rodent cell lines